Studies in Family Planning is a quarterly peer-reviewed academic journal published by Wiley on behalf of the Population Council.  The journal was established in 1963.  Its current editor-in-chief is Jeffrey B. Bingenheimer. The journal publishes articles on public health, social science, and biomedical research on sexual and reproductive health, fertility, and family planning, primarily focused on developing countries. Submissions of original research articles, reports, data papers, and commentaries are accepted.   In 2018, the journal published a special online issue, The Evolution of Family Planning Programs, edited by John Bongaarts.

According to the Journal Citation Reports, the journal has a 2017 impact factor of 1.478, ranking it 10th out of 28 journals in the category "Demography".

References

External links 
 

Wiley-Blackwell academic journals
English-language journals
Publications established in 1963
Sociology journals
Demography journals